2020 NBA season may refer to:

2019–20 NBA season
2020–21 NBA season